Karuiro is a settlement in Kenya's Central Province.

References 

located in kigumo district

Populated places in Central Province (Kenya)